The Village of Harrison Hot Springs is a small community at the southern end of Harrison Lake in the Fraser Valley of British Columbia. It is a member of the Fraser Valley Regional District; its immediate neighbour is the District of Kent and included in it, the town of Agassiz. It is a resort community known for its hot springs and has a population of just over 1500 people. It is named after Benjamin Harrison, a former deputy governor for the Hudson's Bay Company.

History
The Village of Harrison Hot Springs has been a small resort community since 1886 when the opening of the Canadian Pacific Railway brought the lakeside springs within a short carriage ride of the transcontinental mainline.  In its first promotion as a resort it was known as St. Alice's Well, although Europeans had discovered it (not new to indigenous communities) decades earlier when a party of goldfield-bound travelers on Harrison Lake capsized into what they thought was their doom, only to discover the lake at that spot was not freezing, but warm.

Although the resort flourished in a low-key fashion for years after this discovery was exploited by hoteliers, the Village of Harrison Hot Springs was not incorporated until 1949.  Its namesake hot springs are a major attraction for tourists who come to stay at the village's spa resort.

The hot springs themselves were originally used and revered by the Sts'Ailes (Chehalis) First Nations people who live along the Harrison River nearby. There are two hot springs, the "Potash", with a temperature of 40 °C, and the "Sulphur", with a temperature of 65 °C. According to Harrison Hot Springs Resort, the waters average 1300 ppm of dissolved mineral solids, one of the highest concentrations of any mineral spring.  This hot spring is one of several lining the valley of the Lillooet River and Harrison Lake.  The northernmost of the Lillooet River hot springs is at Meager Creek, north of Whistler, with another well-known one to the east of Whistler at Skookumchuck Hot Springs, midway between Pemberton and Port Douglas.  One feature of this chain of hot springs is that the Harrison Hot Springs vent is the most sulfuric, and there is consistently less sulfur content as one goes northwards, with the springs at Meager Creek having almost no scent at all.

Geography

Megatsunami risk
Some geologists consider that an unstable rock face at Mount Breakenridge above the north end of the giant fresh-water fjord of Harrison Lake in the Lower Mainland of southwestern British Columbia, Canada, could collapse into the lake, generating a large wave that might destroy the town of Harrison Hot Springs (located at its south end).

Demographics

The population of Harrison Hot Springs grew from 1996 to 2006, when the Canadian Census reported 655 people in 1991, 898 in 1996, 1,343 in 2001, and 1,573 in 2006. It has since receded slightly to 1,468 in 2011 and 2016.

Religion 
According to the 2021 census, religious groups in Harrison Hot Springs included:
Irreligion (1,075 persons or 57.6%)
Christianity (735 persons or 39.4%)
Sikhism (30 persons or 1.6%)
Islam (10 persons or 0.5%)
Other (15 persons or 0.8%)

Economy
Harrison Hot Springs' major economy is tourism in relation to the hot springs, with over half of employment found in service industries, with much of the rest found split through retail, government, construction and manufacturing are represented, as well as minor activity in other areas.

Attractions
Harrison Hot Springs' greatest attraction is its titular springs, of course, but it also has the Ranger Station Public Art Gallery, a marina with jet boat tours of the lake available, a nine-hole golf course, and is the closest access to Sasquatch Provincial Park. In July, Harrison Hot Springs hosts the Harrison Festival of the Arts, a ten-day celebration of world music and art.  The annual Festival features free outdoor beach concerts, ticketed evening performances, a children's day, visual art exhibits, various workshops, and two weekend art markets.  The Harrison Festival also presents ten to twelve professional performing arts events between September and May each year.

Government

The Corporation of the Village of Harrison Hot Springs was incorporated as a municipality in 1949 under the initiative of Colonel Andy Naismith (ret). It has a mayor and four councillors.

Harrison Hot Springs is part of the Chilliwack-Hope provincial electoral district. Federally, Harrison Hot Springs is in the Mission-Matsqui-Fraser Canyon riding, represented in the House of Commons of Canada.

Media

See also
Harrison Mills, British Columbia
Agassiz, British Columbia

References

External links

Hot springs of British Columbia
Populated places in the Fraser Valley Regional District
Villages in British Columbia